PGE Skra Bełchatów 2010–2011 season is the 2010/2011 volleyball season for Polish professional volleyball club PGE Skra Bełchatów. The club won 7th title of Polish Champion, Polish Cup 2011 and silver medal of FIVB Club World Championship.

The club competed in:
 Polish Championship
 Polish Cup
 CEV Champions League
 FIVB Club World Championship

Team roster

Squad changes for the 2010–2011 season
In:

Out:

Most Valuable Players

General classification

Results, schedules and standings

2010–11 PlusLiga

Regular season

References

PGE Skra Bełchatów seasons